Events from the year 1829 in France.

Incumbents
 Monarch – Charles X
 Prime Minister – Jean Baptiste Gay (until 8 August), then Jules de Polignac

Events
17 November – Jules de Polignac becomes president of the council of ministers.
Red trousers (pantalons rouge or garance) adopted as standard Army uniform.
Barthélemy Thimonnier invented the "sewing machine"

Births
10 January – Henri-Émile Bazin, hydraulic engineer (d. 1917)
20 February – Charles-Auguste Lebourg, sculptor (d. 1906)
22 February – Henri-Jacques Espérandieu, architect (d. 1874)
18 July – Paul Dubois, sculptor (d. 1905)
25 November – Charles de Varigny, adventurer, diplomat, translator and writer (d. 1899)
21 December – Gabriel-Auguste Ancelet, architect (d. 1895)
date unknown – Peter Howard, U.S. sailor (d. 1875)

Deaths
18 March – Alexandre-Théodore-Victor, comte de Lameth, soldier and politician (b. 1760)
6 July – Pierre Dumanoir le Pelley, admiral (b. 1770)
23 August – Pierre Deval, diplomat (b. 1758)
5 September – Pierre, comte Daru, soldier, statesman, historian and poet (b. 1767)
13 December – Charles Dambray, chancellor of France (b. 1760)

See also

References

1820s in France